Haribahu Shankar Mahale was a member of the 13th Lok Sabha of India. He represented the Malegaon constituency of Maharashtra and was a member of the Bharatiya Janata Party political party.

References

India MPs 1999–2004
1930 births
2005 deaths
Marathi politicians
Janata Dal politicians
Janata Dal (Secular) politicians
Lok Sabha members from Maharashtra
People from Malegaon
India MPs 1977–1979
India MPs 1989–1991
Bharatiya Janata Party politicians from Maharashtra
Janata Party politicians